The Mayor of the City of the Gold Coast is presiding officer and public face of the Gold Coast City Council, the local government body of the Gold Coast, Queensland. The current Mayor is Tom Tate.

The mayor is charged with representing the city council and is popularly elected by residents of the City of Gold Coast local government area in local elections held every 4 years. The mayor presides over all council meetings; is the only councillor to not represent a specific Gold Coast electoral district; and is the foremost representative of the Gold Coast City Council and its policies.

The Gold Coast City Council reportedly maintains a budget of an estimated $1.83 billion annually, among the highest of municipal governments in Australia. The mayor's office is located in the Southport Town Hall building in Southport, Queensland.

Mayoral responsibilities

Under the Local Government Act 2009 (Qld), Chapter 2, Part 1, the mayor of any city in Queensland, including the Gold Coast and except for Brisbane, has the following responsibilities in addition to their duty as a councillor:

 Leading and managing meetings of the local government at which the mayor is the chairperson, including managing the conduct of the participants at the meetings.
 Preparing and proposing the adoption of the local government's budget.
 Liaising with the chief executive officer on behalf of the other councillors.
 Leading, managing, and providing strategic direction to, the chief executive officer in order to achieve the high quality administration of the local government.
 Directing the chief executive officer, in accordance with the local government's policies.
 Conducting a performance appraisal of the chief executive officer, at least annually, in the way that is decided by the local government (including as a member of a committee, for example).
 Ensuring that the local government promptly provides the Minister with the information about the local government area, or the local government, that is requested by the Minister for Local Government.
 Being a member of each standing committee of the local government.
 Representing the local government at ceremonial or civic functions.

Delegation of mayoral responsibilities

The Act further stipulates that "a councillor who is not the mayor may perform the mayor's extra responsibilities only if the mayor delegates the responsibility to the councillor," while also stating that "when performing a responsibility, a councillor must serve the overall public interest of the whole local government area."

List of Gold Coast Mayors
The current Gold Coast mayor is Tom Tate. He was first elected on 28 April 2012 and re-elected on both 19 March 2016 and 28 March 2020 with more than two thirds of the preferential vote.

Former town/shire leaders
Prior to the South Coast council forming in 1948, ten local government areas existed between the City of Brisbane and the New South Wales border. Just four of those local government areas exist within modern day Gold Coast. Below is a list of the leaders of those areas:

Town of Coolangatta

Shire of Coomera

Shire of Nerang

Town/Shire of Southport

On 9 December 1948, as part of a major reorganisation of local government in South East Queensland, an Order in Council created the Shire of Albert by amalgamating Shire of Beenleigh, Shire of Coomera, Shire of Nerang, the southern part of Shire of Tingalpa and the eastern part of Shire of Waterford. On 8 June 1978, the Shire of Logan was created which reduced the Shire of Albert to nearly a quarter of its previous population. The Shire of Albert was amalgamated with the Gold Coast City Council in 1995. With the exception of the Beenleigh–Eagleby region, which was transferred to Logan City in 2008, the area of the Albert Shire is still present in modern-day City of Gold Coast.

Shire of Albert

Governance of Gold Coast City

The city is governed at the local level by the Gold Coast City Council, whose jurisdiction spans the Gold Coast, Queensland, and surrounding areas. Based on resident population, it is the second largest local government area in Australia and its council maintains a staff of over 2,500. It was established in 1948, but has existed in its present form since 1995.

Wards and councillors
Gold Coast City has been divided into 14 wards (known as divisions), each electing one councillor at elections held every four years. The most recent local government election was on 19 March 2016.

Divisional Councillors are:

 Division 1:  Cr Donna Gates Dep Mayor – Yatala
 Division 2:  Cr William Owen-Jones – Coomera
 Division 3:  Cr Cameron Caldwell – Paradise Point
 Division 4:  Cr Kristyn Boulton – Biggera Waters
 Division 5:  Cr Peter Young – Pacific Pines, Nerang and Hinterland areas
 Division 6:  Cr Dawn Crichlow – Southport
 Division 7:  Cr Gary Baildon – Surfers Paradise
 Division 8:  Cr Robert La Castra – Ashmore
 Division 9:  Cr Glen Tozer – Mudgeeraba
 Division 10: Cr Paul Taylor – Broadbeach
 Division 11: Cr Hermann Vorster – Robina
 Division 12: Cr Pauline Young – Burleigh Heads
 Division 13: Cr Daphne McDonald – Palm Beach
 Division 14: Cr Gail O'Neill – Coolangatta

See also

 Gold Coast, Queensland
 List of mayors of Gold Coast
 Local Government Areas of Queensland

References

City of Gold Coast